This is a list of Belgian football transfers for the 2008 summer transfer window. Only transfers involving a team from the Jupiler League are listed.

Sorted by date

January 2008

February 2008

March 2008

April 2008

May 2008

Notes: 
 1 Iakovenko was already on loan to Anderlecht since January 2008. Anderlecht used the option in the contract to buy him.
 2 Dreesen was on loan to Sint-Truiden, now loaned to Lierse.

June 2008

Notes:
 3 Vanderhaeghe ends his career as a footballer and becomes assistant-coach under Hein Vanhaezebrouck at Kortrijk.
 4 Kums was already on loan to Kortrijk since January 2008. Kortrijk used the option in the contract to buy him.
 5 Théréau was already on loan to Charleroi, now bought.
 6 Dufoor was on loan to Dender, now sold to Tienen.
 7 Tioté was on loan to Roda JC, now sold to Twente.

July 2008

 8 Pudil was on loan to Slavia Prague, now sold to Genk.
 9 Slović was on loan to Antwerp, contract was now ended and Antwerp signed him for free on 22 July.

August 2008

 10 Siani was on loan to Brussels, now loaned to Sint-Truiden.
 11 Vukomanović was on loan to Maccabi Herzliya, now sold to Antwerp.

September 2008

Sorted by team

Anderlecht

In:

 

 

Out:

Cercle Brugge

In:

Out:

Charleroi

In:

Out:

Club Brugge

In:

Out:

Dender

In:

Out:

Genk

In:

Out:

Gent

In:

Out:

Germinal Beerschot

In:

Out:

Kortrijk

In:

Out:

Lokeren

In:

Out:

Mechelen

In:

Out:

Mons

In:

Out:

Mouscron

In:

Out:

Roeselare

In:

Out:

Standard Liège

In:

Out:

Tubize

In:

Out:

Westerlo

In:

Out:

Zulte Waregem

In:

Out:

See also
List of Dutch football transfers Summer 2008
List of English football transfers Summer 2008
List of Spanish football transfers Summer 2008

References

Belgian
Transfers Summer
2008 Summer